Jamilon Mülders (born 29 May 1976) is a German field hockey coach and a former player for the German national team. He is the former coach for the Chinese national team. Jamilon is the current coach of the Dutch ladies national team.

He coached the German national team at the 2016 Summer Olympics, where the team won the bronze medal.

References

Living people
1976 births
German male field hockey players
German field hockey coaches
2002 Men's Hockey World Cup players
Place of birth missing (living people)
German expatriates in China